Godefridus Jan "Fred" de Graaf (born 28 February 1950) is a retired Dutch politician of the People's Party for Freedom and Democracy (VVD) and jurist.

De Graaf a jurist by occupation, worked as a civil servant for the Ministry of the Interior from 1975 until 1981. He was as a member of the municipal council of Voorschoten from 1978 to 1981. Afterwards he served as Mayor of Leersum from 16 June  1981 until 16 January 1989 when he became Mayor of Vught, serving until 16 February 1999 when he became Mayor of Apeldoorn, serving until his resignation on 1 October 2011. He served as the Parliamentary leader of the People's Party for Freedom and Democracy in the Senate from 14 October 2010 until 15 February 2011. In the Dutch Senate election of 2011, the People's Party for Freedom and Democracy won the most seats and De Graaf was selected as next President of the Senate. De Graaf announced his resignation as President of the Senate of the Netherlands following criticism on his neutrality; he remained in office until Ankie Broekers-Knol was elected as successor. He presided the coronation of King Willem-Alexander on 30 April 2013.

Decorations

References

External links
 

Official
  Mr. G.J. (Fred) de Graaf Parlement & Politiek
  Mr. G.J. de Graaf (VVD) Eerste Kamer der Staten-Generaal

 

 

 

1950 births
Living people
Dutch jurists
Dutch members of the Dutch Reformed Church
Dutch nonprofit directors
Dutch nonprofit executives
Mayors of Amstelveen
Mayors in Gelderland
People from Bronckhorst
Mayors of Enschede
Mayors in North Brabant
People from Heerde
Mayors in Utrecht (province)
People from Leersum
People from Udenhout
People from Vught
Members of the Senate (Netherlands)
Municipal councillors in South Holland
Officers of the Order of Orange-Nassau
People from Apeldoorn
People from Roosendaal
People from Voorschoten
People's Party for Freedom and Democracy politicians
Presidents of the Senate (Netherlands)
Protestant Church Christians from the Netherlands
Recipients of the Order of the Sacred Treasure, 3rd class
University of Groningen alumni
20th-century Dutch civil servants
20th-century Dutch politicians
21st-century Dutch politicians